Kate Snodgrass is an American theater director and playwright.  She is the artistic director of Boston Playwrights' Theatre. She is a professor of the practice of playwriting in the English Department of Boston University. Snodgrass won the 2012 Elliot Norton Award for Excellence.

She co-founded the Boston Theater Marathon which also has won the Elliot Norton Award. Snodgrass is a former Kennedy Center American College Theater Festival National Chair of the Playwriting Program, a former vice president of StageSource, Inc., and a member of Actors' Equity Association, American Federation of Television and Radio Artists, and Dramatists Guild of America.

Snodgrass is a playwriting Fellow at the Huntington Theatre Company. She is the author of the 1995 play Haiku (Heidemann Award, anthologized and translated into German, Gaelic, Portuguese), Observatory Conditions (Independent Reviewers of New England Award), and The Glider (2004) (Independent Reviewers of New England Award, American Association of Community Theatre's Steinberg Award Nomination), among others.

Snodgrass coordinates the Second Sunday Reading Series, which features a play in development, voiced by a full cast of characters, held the second Sunday of each month (October through April) at Erbaluce in Boston.

As a teacher and educator, Snodgrass has received StageSource's Theatre Hero Award, the Leonides A. Nickole Theatre Educator of the Year Award for Excellence, and the Milan Stitt Award for Outstanding Teacher of Playwrighting from the Kennedy Center American College Theatre Festival. Her short plays L'Air Des Alpes, Que Sera, Sera, Critics' Circle and Wasteland have been published/anthologized by Cedar Press, Dramatic Publishing Company, Bakers Plays, and Smith & Kraus Publishers, respectively.

Snodgrass holds B.A. degrees from the University of Kansas and Wichita State University, and a master's degree in creative writing from Boston University.

Plays
Haiku
The Glider
Brickwork
The Seduction
Parallelogram
Rubik's Goldberg Variation
New Hampshire
OZ
Critics' Circle
Observatory Conditions
L'Air Des Alpes
Que Sera, Sera
Spaghetti Al Dente
Prairie Echoes
Asylum
How I Saw the Light
Circus

References

External links
Website for Boston Playwrights' Theatre
"Haiku" (Pt. 1): A Magic Hours Communication video

20th-century American dramatists and playwrights
21st-century American dramatists and playwrights
American theatre directors
American women dramatists and playwrights
Boston University College of Arts and Sciences alumni
Boston University faculty
Living people
Place of birth missing (living people)
University of Kansas alumni
Wichita State University alumni
Women theatre directors
Year of birth missing (living people)
21st-century American women writers
20th-century American women writers
American women academics